The Ira F. Powers Building, now known as the Director Building, is an historic building located at 804–810 Southwest 3rd Avenue in Portland, Oregon, United States. The building was added to the National Register of Historic Places on December 2, 1985.

See also
 Ira F. Powers Warehouse and Factory
 National Register of Historic Places listings in Southwest Portland, Oregon

References

External links
 

1910 establishments in Oregon
Chicago school architecture in Oregon
Commercial buildings completed in 1910
National Register of Historic Places in Portland, Oregon
Southwest Portland, Oregon